Whittenburg Creek is a stream in Crawford County in the U.S. state of Missouri.

The stream source area lies between Steelville and Cherryville. The stream flows generally north passing under Route 19 south of Steelville and under Route 8 just east of Steelville. The stream flows past the historic community of Sankey and on north to join the Meramec at Birds Nest.

Whittenburg Creek has the name of a local family.

See also
List of rivers of Missouri

References

Rivers of Crawford County, Missouri
Rivers of Missouri